Babacar Sarr (born 15 February 1991) is a Senegalese former professional footballer, who is most known for the two separate rape accusations he has against him from two different women in Norway, for which he is wanted by Interpol due to the lack of presence in the trials.

Career
Sarr started his professional career at Icelandic team Selfoss, before being loaned out to French side CA Bastia in 2012.

In December 2012, Sarr signed a four-year contract with Norwegian club Start. He made his debut on 17 March 2013 against Hønefoss, helping his team to a 3–2 win.

On 13 July 2014, Sarr signed for Norwegian side Sogndal, playing there for two seasons before signing for Molde. He was released from his contract with Molde by mutual consent on 18 January 2019.

On 5 February 2019, Sarr signed for Yenisey Krasnoyarsk. On 3 March 2019, in his Yenisey debut, he scored a late equalizer in a 1–1 game against FC Rostov. Following Yenisey's relegation from the Russian Premier League at the end of the 2018–19 season, Sarr was released by the club.

Just hours after Norwegian police declared him internationally wanted, Damac of the Saudi Professional League announced his signature on 11 June 2019.

Trial
As of 2023, he is an international fugitive wanted for failing to appear in appellate court in Norway, after he was acquitted in the lower court, regarding the rape charge.

In August 2018 at Molde District Court, Sarr was acquitted of one case of rape whilst a player of Molde. In 2023 media quoted the court verdict: the accuser woke up, "wearing a top, a jacket and a handbag (shoulder bag). The strap of the handbag was over her one shoulder, on the outer surface of the jacket [...] The possibility of Sarr [... and her] having had intercourse [...] while Visnes [the accuser] was dressed like that, is quite unlikely". He was then sentenced to pay reparation to the woman. 

As of 2021, the case is under appeal. He is wanted by Interpol as of 2023; the international arrest warrant, is scheduled to run until 2025. In 2021, media wrote that Sarr no longer resides in Saudi Arabia.

In March 2020, the Supreme Court rejected the appeal from Sarr, who was sentenced to pay 150.000 Kroner in compensation to the woman in this rape case. The compensation judgement is thus final.

Accusation that did not make it to trial
In February 2020, Sarr was again accused of a rape; the allegation was that a crime took place in November of 2018, after Molde played an away match against Sandefjord. This case was dropped at the end of February 2020 because the police had not informed Sarr that the investigation against him had resumed within the statutory deadline of three months.

Career statistics

References

1991 births
Living people
Senegalese footballers
Association football midfielders
IK Start players
Sogndal Fotball players
CA Bastia players
Molde FK players
FC Yenisey Krasnoyarsk players
Damac FC players
Eliteserien players
Norwegian First Division players
Saudi Professional League players
Russian Premier League players
Senegalese expatriate footballers
Expatriate footballers in Iceland
Senegalese expatriate sportspeople in Iceland
Expatriate footballers in Norway
Senegalese expatriate sportspeople in Norway
Expatriate footballers in Russia
Senegalese expatriate sportspeople in Russia
Expatriate footballers in Saudi Arabia
Senegalese expatriate sportspeople in Saudi Arabia
Fugitives wanted by Norway